Namla is a poorly documented Papuan language of Indonesia. It appears to be related to Tofanma, a neighboring language. It is spoken in Namla village, Senggi District, Keerom Regency.

Namla is close to extinction due to its being replaced by Tofanma and possibly also Papuan Malay.

Vocabulary
Namla vocabulary from Foley (2018):

{| class="wikitable sortable"
! gloss !! Namla
|-
| ‘bird’ || atu
|-
| ‘blood’ || ləke
|-
| ‘bone’ || da
|-
| ‘breast’ || momu
|-
| ‘ear’ || wuronodake
|-
| ‘eat’ || sa
|-
| ‘egg’ || le
|-
| ‘eye’ || lɪle
|-
| ‘fire’ || wo
|-
| ‘give’ || væn
|-
| ‘go’ || wo
|-
| ‘ground’ || jao
|-
| ‘hair’ || kəmbrada
|-
| ‘hear’ || wara
|-
| ‘I’ || na
|-
| ‘leg’ || buda
|-
| ‘louse’ || ble
|-
| ‘man’ || lamokra
|-
| ‘moon’ || pei
|-
| ‘name’ || ei
|-
| ‘one’ || knonu
|-
| ‘road, path’ || mitu
|-
| ‘see’ || mesa
|-
| ‘sky’ || nəmləu
|-
| ‘stone’ || sou
|-
| ‘sun’ || nəmane
|-
| ‘tongue’ || kagoku
|-
| ‘tooth’ || dəmda
|-
| ‘tree’ || ra
|-
| ‘two’ || nene
|-
| ‘water’ || nomu
|-
| ‘we’ || mani
|-
| ‘woman’ || ara
|-
| ‘you (sg)’ || wu(giknoko)
|-
| ‘you (pl)’ || yuka
|}

References

Languages of western New Guinea
Namla–Tofanma languages